Nina Munch-Søgaard (born 26 November 1987) is a Norwegian former professional tennis player.

She won four doubles titles on the ITF Women's Circuit in her career. On 8 May 2006, she reached her best singles ranking of world No. 539. On 1 October 2007, she peaked at No. 531 in the doubles rankings.

Playing for Norway in Fed Cup competition, Munch-Søgaard has a win/loss record of 4–0.

She retired from the tour 2011.

ITF finals

Doubles (4–3)

Fed Cup participation

Singles

Doubles

References

External links
 
 
 

1987 births
Living people
Norwegian female tennis players
21st-century Norwegian women